Lough Ea is a lake located to the east of the town of Glenties, near the R253 road in County Donegal, Ireland. The lake is the source of the Owenea River which meets the Atlantic Ocean  to the west.

References 

Lakes of County Donegal